Édouard Dubois (born 14 March 1989) is a French professional golfer.

Dubois was born in Libourne, France. He turned professional in 2008.

In 2009, Dubois finished sixth on the Alps Tour Order of Merit, including his maiden professional win, and progressed to the final stage of European Tour Qualifying School, which earned him a Challenge Tour card. He finished 42nd on that tour in his 2010 debut season, qualifying for the end-of-season Grand Final, and in 2011 picked up his first win at that level, at the Kärnten Golf Open. He followed this with a second win three weeks later.

Amateur wins
2008 Trophée de Margaux

Professional wins (5)

Challenge Tour wins (2)

Alps Tour wins (1)

Pro Golf Tour wins (1)

Other wins (1)
2011 Open d'Arcachon

Team appearances
Amateur
European Boys' Team Championship (representing France): 2004, 2005, 2006, 2007
Jacques Léglise Trophy (representing Continental Europe): 2007
European Amateur Team Championship (representing France): 2008

See also
2011 Challenge Tour graduates

References

External links

French male golfers
European Tour golfers
People from Libourne
Sportspeople from Bordeaux
1989 births
Living people